Gern is an U-Bahn station in Munich on the U1. The station includes displays on local history, and is also noted for its innovative lighting; nine pyramidal aluminium fixtures give the illusion of daylight streaming in from above.

References

Munich U-Bahn stations
Railway stations in Germany opened in 1998